Chuckie may refer to:

Chuckie (name)
"Chuckie", a track on the 1991 album We Can't Be Stopped by Geto Boys
Chuckie Egg, a 1983 home computer video game
Chuckie Egg 2, its 1985 sequel

See also

Chucky (disambiguation)
"Chuck E.'s In Love", 1979 Rickie Lee Jones song

Lists of people by nickname
Hypocorisms